Geodorum terrestre, commonly known as pink shepherds' crook or bent orchid, is a plant in the orchid family and is native to areas from tropical Asia to northern Australia. It is a terrestrial orchid with broad, pleated leaves and up to and twenty pale pink flowers with dark red veins on the labellum. It grows in wetter habitats including swamps.

Description
As the flowers open, the flowering stem droops downwards and as the flowers wilt, the stem becomes upright again. Flowering occurs between December and February in Australia and between March and May, or October and November in Asia.

Taxonomy and naming
Pink shepherds' crook was first described in 1759 by Carl Linnaeus who gave it the name Epidendrum terrestre. He published the description in the 10th edition of Systema Naturae, based on an illustration in Rumphius's Herbarium amboinense. In 1994, Paul Abel Ormerod changed the name to Phaius terrestris but Leslie Andrew Garay considers that it was a mistake to attempt to reconcile Linnaeus' description with a later description from 1763, and relies on the original illustration in the Herbarium Amboinense. In 1997, Garay changed the name to Geodorum terrestre. The specific epithet (terrestre) is a Latin word meaning "of the earth", referring to the terrestrial habit of this orchid.

Distribution and habitat
Geodorum terrestre occurs between Nepal and northern Australia. It grows in moist forest including rainforest, in river gullies and near waterfalls. In Australia it occurs in the Kimberley region of Western Australia, in northern parts of the Northern Territory and in eastern Australia between Cape York and the Macleay River in New South Wales.

References

Plants described in 1759
terrestre
Orchids of Australia
Orchids of China
Orchids of India
Orchids of Thailand
Orchids of Indonesia
Orchids of Malaysia
Orchids of Myanmar
Orchids of Nepal
Orchids of New Guinea
Orchids of Asia